The Fuzhou language, also Foochow, Hokchew, Hok-chiu, or Fuzhounese, is the prestige variety of the Eastern Min branch of Min Chinese spoken mainly in the Mindong region of Eastern Fujian Province. As it is mutually unintelligible to neighbouring varieties (e.g. Hokkien) in the province, under a technical linguistic definition Fuzhou is a language and not a dialect (conferring the variety a 'dialect' status is more socio-politically motivated than linguistic). Thus, while Fuzhou may be commonly referred to as a 'dialect' by laypersons, this is colloquial usage and not recognised in academic linguistics. Like many other varieties of Chinese, the Fuzhou dialect is dominated by monosyllabic morphemes that carry lexical tones, and has a mainly analytic syntax. While the Eastern Min branch it belongs to is relatively closer to other branches of Min such as Southern Min or Pu-Xian Min than to other Sinitic branches such as Mandarin, Wu Chinese or Hakka, they are still not mutually intelligible.

Centered in Fuzhou City, the Fuzhou dialect covers 11 cities and counties in China: Fuzhou City Proper, Pingnan, Gutian, Luoyuan, Minqing, Lianjiang, Minhou, Changle, Yongtai, Fuqing and Pingtan; and Lienchiang County (the Matsu Islands), in Taiwan (the ROC). It is also the second local language in many northern and middle Fujian cities and counties such as Nanping, Shaowu, Shunchang, Sanming and Youxi.

The Fuzhou dialect is also widely spoken in some regions abroad, especially in Southeastern Asian countries like Malaysia and Indonesia. The Malaysian city of Sibu is called "New Fuzhou" due to the influx of immigrants there in the late 19th century and early 1900s. Many Fuzhou people have also emigrated to Japan, the United States, Canada, the United Kingdom, Australia, New Zealand and Singapore.

Name
In Chinese, it is sometimes called  (pinyin: Fúzhōuyǔ). Native speakers also call it Bàng-uâ, meaning "the everyday language."

In older works written in English, the variety is called "Foochow dialect", based on the Chinese postal romanization of Fuzhou.

In Indonesia (especially in Surabaya of East Java), it is known locally as "Hokchia". Meanwhile in Malaysia and Singapore, it is often called "Hokchiu", which is the pronunciation of Fuzhou in the Southern Min Hokkien language or "Huchiu", which is the pronunciation of Fuzhou in the Eastern Min language of Fuzhou itself. Eastern Min and Southern Min are both spoken in the same Fujian Province, but the name Hokkien, while etymologically derived from the same characters as Fujian, is used in Southeast Asia and the English press to refer specifically to Southern Min, which has a larger number of speakers both within Fujian and in the Chinese diaspora of Southeast Asia.

History

Formation

After the Qin dynasty conquered the Minyue kingdom of Southeast China in 110 BC, Chinese people began settling what is now Fujian Province. The Old Chinese language brought by the mass influx of Chinese immigrants from the Chinese heartland, along with the influences of local languages, became the early Proto-Min language from which Eastern Min, Southern Min, and other Min languages arose. Within this Min branch of Chinese, Eastern Min and Southern Min both form part of a Coastal Min subgroup, and are thus closer to each other than to Inland Min groups such as Northern Min and Central Min.

The famous book Qī Lín Bāyīn, which was compiled in the 17th century, is the first and the most full-scale rime book that provides a systematic guide to character reading for people speaking or learning the Fuzhou dialect. It once served to standardize the language and is still widely quoted as an authoritative reference book in modern academic research in Min Chinese phonology.

Studies by Western missionaries

In 1842, Fuzhou was open to Westerners as a treaty port after the signing of the Treaty of Nanjing. But due to the language barrier, however, the first Christian missionary base in this city did not take place without difficulties. In order to convert Fuzhou people, those missionaries found it very necessary to make a careful study of the Fuzhou dialect. Their most notable works are listed below:

 1856, M. C. White: The Chinese language spoken at Fuh Chau
 1870, R. S. Maclay & C. C. Baldwin: An alphabetic dictionary of the Chinese language in the Foochow dialect
 1871, C. C. Baldwin: Manual of the Foochow dialect
 1891, T. B. Adam: An English-Chinese Dictionary of the Foochow Dialect
 1893, Charles Hartwell: Three Character Classic of Gospel in the Foochow Colloquial
 1898, R. S. Maclay & C. C. Baldwin: An Alphabetic Dictionary of the Chinese Language of the Foochow Dialect, 2nd edition
 1905, T. B. Adam: An English-Chinese Dictionary of the Foochow Dialect, 2nd edition]
 1906, The Foochow translation of the complete Bible
 1923, T. B. Adam & L. P. Peet: An English-Chinese dictionary of the Foochow dialect, 2nd edition
 1929, R. S. Maclay & C. C. Baldwin (revised and enlarged by S. H. Leger): Dictionary of the Foochow dialect

Studies by Japanese scholars

During the Second World War, some Japanese scholars became passionate about studying the Fuzhou dialect, believing that it could be beneficial to the rule of the Greater East Asia Co-Prosperity Sphere. One of their most famous works was the Japanese-Chinese Translation: Fuzhou Dialect published in 1940 in Taipei, in which katakana was used to represent Fuzhou pronunciation.

Status quo

By the end of the Qing dynasty, Fuzhou society had been largely monolingual. But for decades the Chinese government has discouraged the use of the vernacular in school education and in media, so the number of Mandarin speakers has been greatly boosted. Recent reports indicate that less than 50% of young people in Fuzhou are able to speak the Fuzhou dialect.

In Mainland China, the Fuzhou dialect has been officially listed as an Intangible Cultural Heritage and promotion work is being systematically carried out to preserve its use. In Matsu, currently controlled by the Republic of China located in Taiwan, the teaching of the local variant, the Matsu dialect, has been successfully introduced into elementary schools. It is also one of the statutory languages for public transport announcements in Matsu and in Fuzhou.

Phonology

Like all Chinese varieties, the Fuzhou dialect is a tonal language, and has extensive sandhi rules in the initials, rimes, and tones. These complicated rules make the Fuzhou dialect one of the most difficult Chinese varieties.

Tones
There are seven original tones in the Fuzhou dialect, compared with the eight tones of Middle Chinese:

The sample characters are taken from the Qī Lín Bāyīn. More modern studies have also been done in the late 20th century and early 21st centuires, including an acoustically quantified set of data for the citation tones.

In Qī Lín Bāyīn, the Fuzhou dialect is described as having eight tones, which explains how the book got its title (Bāyīn means "eight tones"). That name, however, is somewhat misleading, because Ĭng-siōng and Iòng-siōng are identical in tone contour; therefore, only seven tones exist.

Ĭng-ĭk and Iòng-ĭk (or so-called entering tone) syllables end with either velar stop  or a glottal stop . However, they are both now realized as a glottal stop, though the two phonemes maintain distinct sandhi behavior in connected speech.

Little discussed in the existing literature, there is some evidence that Fuzhou uses non-modal phonation with certain tones: creaky for  ĭng-ké̤ṳ,  ĭng-ĭk,  iòng-ké̤ṳ, and breathy for  siōng-siăng. This has been shown to be perceptually relevant for tonal identification.

Tonal sandhi 
The rules of tonal sandhi in the Fuzhou dialect are complicated, even compared with those of other Min dialects. When two or more than two morphemes combine into a word, the tonal value of the last morpheme remains stable but in most cases those of the preceding morphemes change.

The two-syllable tonal sandhi rules are shown in the table below (the rows give the first syllable's original citation tone, while the columns give the citation tone of the second syllable):

Both are usually realized as the glottal stop by most modern speakers of the Fuzhou dialect, but they are distinguished both in the above tone sandhi behavior, and in initial assimilation that occurs after them.

The three patterns of tone sandhi exhibited in the Fuzhou dialect may be a reflex of the voicing split from Middle Chinese into different registers. This is based on a comparison with the tonal sandhi system of the subdialect of Lianjiang, a very similar but more conservative Eastern Min variety, where three tonal categories on the penultimate syllables  ("Yin" / Ĭng /  from unvoiced consonants in Middle Chinese; "Yang" / Iòng /  from voiced consonants in Middle Chinese; and a third "Shang" / Siōng /  tonal category from the Middle Chinese "rising tone" 上聲 where the Yin and Yang registers have merged) interact with the tonal category of the final syllable to form the sandhi pattern in Lianjiang. Although the effect of the historical tonal registers from Middle Chinese is clear in Lianjiang, the Fuzhou tonal sandhi system has deviated from the older pattern, in that the tone Iòng-ké̤ṳ 陽去, which is from the historical "Yang" tonal register, now follows the sandhi rules for the "Yin" register; and the sandhi tone Ĭng-ĭk-gák 陰入乙 , which comes from the historical "Yin" register, follow the sandhi rules for the merged "Shang" tone.

The tonal sandhi rules of more than two syllables display further complexities:

For four-syllable words, they can be treated as two sequential two-syllable units, and undergo two-syllable tone sandhi accordingly; in faster speech, the first two syllables are reduced to a half dark departing tone, and the remaining two syllables undergo two-syllable tone sandhi.

Initials
There are fifteen initials, including a zero initial realized as a glottal stop :

The Chinese characters in the brackets are also sample characters from Qī Lín Bāyīn.

 and  exist only in connected speech (see Initial assimilation below).

Initial assimilation 
In the Fuzhou dialect, there are various kinds of initial assimilation, all of which are progressive. When two or more than two syllables combine into a word, the initial of the first syllable stays unchanged while those of the following syllables, in most cases, change to match its preceding phoneme, i.e., the coda of its preceding syllable. As with the rime changes, initial assimilation is not as mandatory as tone sandhi in connected speech, and its presence and absence may indicate different parts of speech, different meanings of a single word, or different relationships between groups of words syntactically.

Rimes
The table below shows the seven vowel phonemes of the Fuzhou dialect. Fuzhou is known for its vowel alternations much discussed in the linguistic literature.

However, for most Fuzhou dialect speakers, those two codas are only distinguishable when in the tonal sandhi or initial assimilation.

Close/Open rimes 
Some rimes come in pairs in the above table: the one to the left represents a close rime, while the other represents an open rime. The close/open rimes are closely related with the tones. In single syllables, the tones of Ĭng-bìng, Siōng-siăng, Iòng-bìng and Iòng-ĭk have close rimes, while Ĭng-ké̤ṳ, Ĭng-ĭk and Iòng-ké̤ṳ have open rimes. 

In connected speech, an open rime shifts to its close counterpart in the tonal sandhi.

As with initial assimilation, the closing of open rimes in connected speech is not as compulsory than tone sandhi. It has been described as "a sort of switch that flips on and off to indicate different things", so its presence or absence can indicate different meanings or different syntactic functions.

The phenomenon of close/open rimes is nearly unique to the Fuzhou dialect and this feature makes it especially intricate and reduces its intelligibility, even to speakers of other Min varieties. Even cross-linguistically, such phonological tone-vowel interactions are rare.

Other phonological features

Neutral tone
The neutral tone is attested in the Fuzhou dialect, as well as being found in the Southern Min group and in varieties of Mandarin Chinese, including Beijing-based Standard Mandarin. It is commonly found in some modal particles, aspect markers, and some question-forming negative particles that come after units made up of one tone sandhi domain, and in some adverbs, aspect markers, conjunctions etc. that come before such units. These two types, the post-nucleus and the pre-nucleus neutral tone, exhibit different tone sandhi behavior. Disyllabic neutral tone words are also attested, as are some inter-nuclei neutral tones, mainly connected to the use of 蜀 siŏh // in verbal reduplication.

Vocabulary
Most words in the Fuzhou dialect have cognates in other varieties of Chinese, so a non-Fuzhou speaker would find it much easier to understand the Fuzhou dialect written in Chinese characters than spoken in conversation. However, false friends do exist: for example, "" (mŏ̤h sá̤-nê) means "don't be too polite" or "make yourself at home", "" (nguāi dó̤i-chiū nṳ̄ sā̤ uāng) means "I help you wash dishes", "" (ĭ gâe̤ng ĭ lâu-mā lā̤ uŏng-gă) means "he and his wife are quarreling (with each other)", etc. Mere knowledge of Mandarin vocabulary, with the cognates  xìnì,  duìshǒu and  yuānjiā, does not assist in understanding the nuance of such sentences.

The majority of Fuzhou dialect vocabulary dates back more than 1,200 years. Some everyday words are still in use as they were in the Tang dynasty, as illustrated by a poem of a renowned Chinese poet of the era, Gu Kuang. In his poem Jiǎn, Gu Kuang explicitly noted:

In the Fuzhou dialect, "" (giāng) for 'son' and "" (nòng-mâ) for 'father' are still in use today.

Words from Old Chinese

Quite a few words from Old Chinese have retained the original meanings for thousands of years, while their counterparts in Mandarin Chinese have either fallen out of daily use or varied to different meanings.

This table shows some Fuzhou dialect words from Old Chinese, as contrasted to Mandarin Chinese:

1 "" (káng) is also used as the verb "to look" in the Fuzhou dialect.
2 "" (iōng) in the Fuzhou dialect means "give birth to (a child)".

This table shows some words that are used in the Fuzhou dialect close to as they were in Classical Chinese, while the meanings in Mandarin Chinese have altered:

Words from Ancient Minyue language

Some daily used words, shared by all Min varieties, came from the ancient Minyue language. Such as follows:

Literary and colloquial readings
The literary and colloquial readings is a feature commonly found in all Chinese dialects throughout China. Literary readings are mainly used in formal phrases derived from the written language, while the colloquial ones are used in colloquial phrases in the spoken language, as well as when used on their own.

Phonologically, a large range of phonemes can differ between the character's two readings: in tone, final, initial, or any and all of these features.

This table displays some widely used characters in the Fuzhou dialect which have both literary and colloquial readings:

Loan words from English
The First Opium War, also known as the First Anglo-Chinese War, was ended in 1842 with the signing of the Treaty of Nanjing, which forced the Qing government to open Fuzhou to all British traders and missionaries. Since then, quite a number of churches and Western-style schools have been established. Consequently, some English words came into the Fuzhou dialect, but without fixed written forms in Chinese characters. The most frequently used words are listed below:
 kŏk, noun, meaning "an article of dress", is from the word "coat";
 nă̤h, noun, meaning "a meshwork barrier in tennis or badminton", is from the word "net";
 pèng, noun, meaning "oil paint", is from the word "paint";
 pĕng-giāng, noun, meaning "a small sum of money", is from the word "penny";
 tă̤h, noun, meaning "money", is from the word "take";
 sò̤, verb, meaning "to shoot (a basket)", is from the word "shoot";
 ă-gì, verb, meaning "to pause (usually a game)", is from the word "again".
 Mā-lăk-gă, meaning "Southeastern Asian (esp. Singapore and Malaysia)", is from the word "Malacca".

Examples

Some common phrases in the Fuzhou dialect:
 Fuzhou dialect:  Hók-ciŭ-uâ 
 Hello:   
 Good-bye:   
 Please:   ;   
 Thank you:   ;  Kī-dâe̤ng 
 Sorry:   
 This:   ;   ;   
 That:   ;   ; 許  
 How much?:   (niŏh-uâi) 
 Yes:   ;   ;   (Duŏh) 
 No:   ;   ;   (Mâ̤ duŏh) 
 I don't understand:   
 What's his name?:   
 Where's the hotel?:   
 How can I go to the school?:   
 Do you speak the Fuzhou dialect?:   
 Do you speak English?:

Writing system

Chinese characters

Most words of the Fuzhou dialect stem from Old Chinese and can therefore be written in Chinese characters. Many books published during the Qing dynasty had been written in this traditional way, such as the famous Mǐndū Biéjì (Foochow Romanized: Mìng-dŭ Biék-gé). However, Chinese characters as the writing system for the Fuzhou dialect can have many shortcomings.

First, a great number of words are unique to the Fuzhou dialect, so that they can only be written in informal ways. For instance, the word "mâ̤", a negative word, has no common form. Some write it as "" or "", both of which share with it an identical pronunciation but have an irrelevant meaning; and others prefer to use a newly created character, combining "" and "", but this character is not included in most fonts.

Second, the Fuzhou dialect has been excluded from the educational system for many decades. As a result, many if not all take for granted that the Fuzhou dialect does not have a formal writing system and when they have to write it, they tend to employ characters with a similar Mandarin Chinese enunciation. For example, " (â̤ sāi)", meaning "okay", are frequently written as "" because they are uttered almost in the same way.

Foochow Romanized

Foochow Romanized, also known as Bàng-uâ-cê (BUC for short) or Hók-ciŭ-uâ Lò̤-mā-cê, is a romanized orthography for the Fuzhou dialect adopted in the middle of 19th century by American and English missionaries. It had varied at different times, and became standardized several decades later. Foochow Romanized was mainly used inside of church circles, and was taught in some mission schools in Fuzhou.

Mǐnqiāng Kuàizì

Mǐnqiāng Kuàizì (Foochow Romanized: Mìng-kiŏng Kuái-cê), literally meaning "Fujian Colloquial Fast Characters", is a Qieyin System for Fuzhou dialect designed by Chinese scholar and calligrapher Li Jiesan in 1896.

Example text
Below is Article 1 of the Universal Declaration of Human Rights written in the Fuzhou dialect, using both Foochow Romanized (left) and Chinese characters (center).

IPA

Literary and art forms

See also
 Fuzhou
 Fuzhou people
 Fuqing dialect
 Chinatown, Brooklyn
 Chinatown, Flushing
 Chinatown, Manhattan
 Manhattan's Little Fuzhou

References

Further reading

Missionary texts

Modern studies

External links

 Fuzhou Dialect Textbook: Elementary school textbook in Matsu.
 Fuzhou dialect phonology, by James Campbell.
 Five Languages Translator
 Fuzhou Dialect Resources
 Eastern Min Chinese (Speech variety #113): Globalrecordings.net. Eastern Min Chinese (Speech variety #113)
 OLAC resources in and about the Eastern Min Chinese language: OLAC. OLAC resources in and about the Eastern Min Chinese language

Eastern Min
City colloquials
Culture in Fujian
Languages of China